Volker Herold (born 29 January 1959, in Thale) is a German actor and director.

Filmography 
 1992: Freunde fürs Leben
 1990-1995: Polizeiruf 110 (3 episodes)
 1996: Alarmcode 112: Vier wie Blitz und Donner
 1998: Moments in Monochrome
 1998: Die Wache (1 episode)
 1999: 
 2001: Alarm für Cobra 11 – Die Autobahnpolizei (1 episode)
 2005: Liebes Spiel
 2005-2007: Verliebt in Berlin (40 episodes)
 2009: Klinik am Alex (2 episodes)
 2009: Liebe ist Verhandlungssache

External links 
 Official Website
 

1959 births
Living people
People from Thale
People from Bezirk Halle
German male television actors